The 1988–89 FDGB-Pokal was the 38th edition of the East German Cup. The competition was won by BFC Dynamo, who secured their third title with a win over FC Karl-Marx-Stadt.

Preliminary round

First round

Second round

Round of 16

Quarter-final

Semi final

Final

Gallery

External links 
 DDR-Football 1988/89 at rsssf.com

FDGB-Pokal seasons
East
Cup